Dashkerpi is a village in the Shirak Province of Armenia.

References 

Populated places in Shirak Province